Darling is the second album by American musician Robert Hazard, released in November 1986 on his own label RHA Records, after being dropped by RCA in 1984. "Hip Pocket" was recorded in California with Rod Stewart's band.

Track listing

Personnel 
Musicians

 Robert Hazard – lead vocals, background vocals, guitar
 Michael Pilla – guitar, background vocals
 Lou Franco – guitar
 Joe McGinty – keyboards, piano
 Bill (Will) Robinson – bass guitar, Upright Bass, keyboard bass, backing vocals
 Michael Radcliffe – bass guitar
 Ed Kamarauskas – drums
 Bobby Bunten – guitar
 Peter Cline – guitar
 Doug Grigsby – bass guitar
 Alan James – guitar
 Anthony Ricco – drums
 Rob Sande – keyboards
 Tony Santoro – guitar
 Jimmy Stout – guitar
 Fred Wackenhut – keyboards
 Jay Williams – guitar
 David Bianco – backing vocals
 Jay Davis – bass guitar (track 2)
 Kevin Savigar – keyboards (track 2)
 Tony Brock – drums (track 2)

Technical

 David Bianco – engineer, mixer, producer
 Randy Cantor – programming

References 

1986 albums